The Junkers Ju 287 was an aerodynamic testbed built in Nazi Germany to develop the technology required for a multi-engine jet bomber. It was powered by four Junkers Jumo 004 engines, featured a novel forward-swept wing, and apart from the wing was assembled largely from components scavenged from other aircraft. It was one of the very few jet propelled aircraft ever built with fixed landing gear.

Development

The Ju 287 was intended to provide the Luftwaffe with a bomber that could avoid interception by outrunning enemy fighters. The swept-forward wing was suggested by the project's head designer Dr. Hans Wocke as a way of providing extra lift at low airspeeds - necessary because of the poor responsiveness of early turbojets at the vulnerable times of takeoff and landing.  A further structural advantage of the forward-swept wing was that it would allow for a single massive weapons bay  in the  best location, the centre of gravity of the plane, with the main wing spar passing behind the bomb bay. The same structural requirement meant the wing could then be located at the best aerodynamic location, the centre of the fuselage.  Prior to the assembly of the first Ju 287, an He 177 A-5 (designated as an He 177 prototype, V38) was modified at the Letov plant in Prague to examine the technical characteristics of this single large bomb bay design.

The first and second prototypes (Ju 287 V1 and V2; both designated Ju 288 V201 and Ju 288 V202 for security reasons) were intended to evaluate the concept, with V1 being intended to test the FSW and V2 being earmarked for evaluating flight at high subsonic speeds, and both were assembled from the fuselages of the He 177 A-5, the tail of the Ju 188G-2, main undercarriage from a Ju 352, and nosewheels taken from shot-down B-24 Liberators, all of which were fixed to lower weight and complexity, and equipped with spats to reduce drag. The  fixed undercarriage was used as the wing box couldn't have cutouts for wheel stowage  which would reduce wing torsion box stiffness required for the forward sweep design. Later prototypes with higher power engines and higher top speed would have the undercarriage stowage in the centre fuselage sides.  Two of the Jumo 004 engines were hung in nacelles (pods) under the wings, with the other two mounted in nacelles added to the sides of the forward fuselage.

Flight tests began on 16 August 1944 (pilot: Siegfried Holzbaur), with the aircraft displaying extremely good handling characteristics, as well as revealing some of the problems of the forward-swept wing under some flight conditions. The most notable of these drawbacks was 'wing warping', or excessive in-flight flexing of the main spar and wing assembly. Tests suggested that the warping problem would be eliminated by concentrating greater engine mass under the wings. This technical improvement would be incorporated in the subsequent prototypes with  under wing engines moved forward under leading edge  as a mass balance.  The Ju 287 was intended to be powered by four Heinkel-Hirth HeS 011 engines, but because of the development problems experienced with that engine, the BMW 003 was selected in its place. The second prototype (Junkers Ju 287 V2) would have had six engines (originally four underwing BMW 003s and two fuselage-mounted Jumo 004s, but later changed to two triple clusters composed of four Jumo 004s and two BMW 003s), and also differed from the Ju 287 V1 in having the main undercarriage struts with an inward cant, the horizontal stabilizer lowered by 30 centimeters, and light grey-colored trouser pants for the nose wheels. The third prototype, the Junkers Ju 287 V3, employed six BMW 003s, in a triple cluster under each wing, and featured the all-new fuselage and tail design intended for the production bomber, the Ju 287A-1, utilizing a pressurised cockpit used on the Junkers Ju 288. The Ju 287 V4 and V5 would have served as prototypes of the Ju 287A-2 and Ju 287B-1 respectively, and the V5 and V6 were to feature tail armament and ejection seats. The Ju 287B-1 would have had four  thrust HeS 011 turbojets, while the Junkers Ju 287B-2 was to employ two  thrust BMW 018 turbojets. While the Heinkel turbojet was in the pre-production phase at war's end, work on BMW's radical and very powerful turbine engine never proceeded past three barely-tested prototypes. The final Ju 287 variant design to be mooted was a Mistel combination-plane ground attack version, comprising an unmanned explosives-packed "drone" 287 and a manned Me 262 fighter attached to the top of the bomber by a strut assembly. The cockpit of the 287 would be replaced by a massive impact-fused warhead.  Takeoff and flight control of the combination would be under the direction of the 262's pilot. The 262 would disengage from the 287 drone as the Mistel neared its target, the pilot of the fighter remotely steering the 287 for the terminal phase of its strike mission.

Work on the Ju 287 programme, along with all other pending German bomber projects (including Junkers' other ongoing heavy bomber design, the piston-engined Ju 488) came to a halt in July 1944, but Junkers was allowed to go forward with the flight testing regime on the V1 prototype. The components for the Junkers Ju 287 V2 had been completed by that time, and were shipped to Brandis for final assembly. Seventeen test flights were undertaken in total, which passed without notable incident.  Minor problems, however, did arise with the turbojet engines and the equally-experimental HWK 109-501 higher-thrust (14.71 kN apiece) bipropellant Starthilfe RATO booster units, which proved to be unreliable over sustained periods.  This initial test phase was designed purely to assess the low-speed handling qualities of the forward-swept wing, but despite this the V1 was dived at full jet power on at least one occasion, attaining a speed in the medium dive-angle employed of 660 km/h. To gain data on airflow patterns, small woolen tufts were glued to the airframe and the "behavior" of these tufts during flight was captured by a cine camera mounted on a sturdy tripod directly ahead of the plane's tailfin. After the seventeenth and last flight in late autumn of 1944, the V1 was transferred to the Luftwaffe's primary Erprobungsstelle evaluation and test centre at [[Rechlin-Lärz Airfield|Rechlin]], for flow tests. However, in March 1945, for unknown reasons, the Ju 287 program was restarted, with the RLM issuing a requirement for mass production of the jet bomber (100 airframes a month) as soon as possible.

Postwar development
The Junkers factory in Dessau was overrun by the Red Army in late April 1945. Before long, the Junkers Ju 287 V2 had been almost completed, waiting for its engines to be fitted, and construction of the V3 had reached 80-90 percent completion, while the V4 was reportedly 60 percent complete. Both V1 and V2 were destroyed by the Nazis to avoid capture by Allied forces. Wocke and his staff were captured by the Red Army and taken to the Soviet Union, and remnants of V2, especially the wings, were used in construction of the EF 131 which was flown on 23 May 1947, but by that time, jet development had already overtaken the Ju 287. A final much-enlarged derivative, the EF 140, was tested in prototype form in 1949 but soon abandoned.Gordon, Yefim (2004). Early Soviet jet bombers: the 1940s and early 1950s. Hinkley: Midland. .

VariantsData from: Junkers Ju 287: The World's First Swept-Wing Jet Aircraft
Ju 287 V1 (cover designation Ju 288 V201) First prototype, technology demonstrator with fixed landing gear, fuselage taken from He 177A-5, tail empennage taken from Ju 188G-2, and 4 x Jumo 004B engines.

Ju 287 V2 (cover designation Ju 288 V202) Second prototype; similar to Ju 287 V1 in overall layout, but with tail wheel removed, horizontal stabilizer lowered 12 inches (30 centimeters), and inward main undercarriage braces; originally intended to utilize 4 x BMW 003s in underwing pairs and 2 x Jumo 004Bs mounted on the sides of the fuselage, but engine configuration later changed to utilize two underwing triple pack configurations composed of 2 x Jumo 004Bs and 1 x BMW 003. Virtually complete when Ju 287 program halted in late 1944, but not flown.

Ju 287 V3 Third prototype, intended prototype for Ju 287A-1; fuselage based on that of the Ju 288, fully glazed, pressurized cockpit accommodating three crewmembers; retractable landing gear, no provision for armament, and 6 x BMW 003 engines mounted in two triple pack configurations under the wings. Approximately 80-90 percent complete by war's end.

Ju 287 V4 Fourth prototype, intended prototype for Ju 287 A-2; layout similar to Ju 287 V3 except in having 6 x Jumo 004Cs (4 mounted in underwing pairs, 2 mounted on the sides of the fuselage); reportedly 60 percent complete on the eve of Allied takeover of Junkers factory at Dessau.

Ju 287 V5 & V6 Armed prototypes equipped with ejection seats and an FHL 131/Z turret with two MG 131 machine guns; V5 intended as prototype of the Ju 287 B-1.

Ju 287 A-1 Production version based on Ju 287 V3 with operational equipment and FHL 131/Z turret featuring two MG 131 machine guns; no ejection seat.

Ju 287 A-2 Production version based on Ju 287 V4 with operational equipment and FHL 131/Z turret featuring two MG 131 machine guns; no ejection seat.

Ju 287 B-1 Production version based on Ju 287 V5 with operational equipment, FHL 131/Z with two MG 131 machine guns, and larger nose wheels; no ejection seat.

Ju 287 B-2 Variant similar to baseline production Ju 287 but powered by either two Junkers Jumo 012 or BMW 018 turbojets mounted under the wings.

EF 131 Similar to production Ju 287 but with fuselage stretched by 8.2 feet (2.5 meters) and two underwing triple packs of RD-10s.

Specifications (Ju 287 V1)

See also

References

Notes

Bibliography
 Ford, Roger. Germany's Secret Weapons of World War II. London, United Kingdom: Amber Books, 2013. .
 Green, William. Warplanes of the Third Reich. New York: Doubleday & Company Inc., 1970.  .
 Hitchcock, Thomas H. Junkers 287 (Monogram Close-Up 1). Acton, Massachusetts: Monogram Aviation Publications, 1974. .
 Jack, Uwe W. Junkers Ju 287 and EF 131: Luftwaffe 6-engine Long-range Aircraft with Forward Swept Wings. N.p.: Jack Aerospace Publishing. 2nd edition, 2021 
 Ransom, Stephen, Peter Korrell and Peter D. Evans. Junkers Ju 287''. Hersham, UK: Ian Allan, 2008. .

External links

Ju 287

1940s German bomber aircraft
1940s German experimental aircraft
Aircraft first flown in 1944
Forward-swept-wing aircraft
Ju 287
Quadjets
World War II experimental aircraft of Germany
World War II jet aircraft of Germany